Gavin Rees Stenhouse (born 4 April 1986) is an English actor best known for television series reboot, Kung Fu, Black Mirror episode: "San Junipero", and Life-Size 2.

Early life
Stenhouse was born and raised in Hong Kong and later moved to Lewes, England. His parents were an airline pilot and a teacher. He trained at the Guildhall School of Music and Drama.

Career
Stenhouse has had small roles in the TV series Sofia's Diary (2008), Off the Hook (2009),  American Horror Story: Coven (2013), Major Crimes (2013), and Person of Interest (2014). He also appeared in the film The Malay Chronicles: Bloodlines (2011).

Stenhouse played Marquess of Dorset in the 2014 touring theatre production of Richard III (play) with Kevin Spacey, directed by Sam Mendes. They performed over 200 times on three continents. The tour was followed by a documentary film crew, resulting in NOW: In the Wings on a World Stage.

In 2015, Stenhouse appeared as Alex O'Connor in the spy TV series, Allegiance. The same year, it was also announced that he would appear in the film Skybound.

In 2016, he appeared in "San Junipero", an episode of the anthology series, Black Mirror.

Stenhouse co-starred in 2018's Freeform's Life-Size 2 opposite Tyra Banks and Francia Raisa.

In 2020, Stenhouse was cast as a series regular in The CW's modern reboot of Kung Fu. On May 3, 2021, Kung Fu was renewed by The CW for a second season.

Filmography

References

External links
 
 
 

1986 births
Living people
Alumni of the Guildhall School of Music and Drama
21st-century Hong Kong male actors
Hong Kong people